Estadio General Joaquín Amaro is a stadium in Mexico City, Mexico.  It is primarily used for American football and is the home field of the Centinelas del Cuerpo de Guardias Presidenciales. It holds 6,500 people.

General Joaquin Amaro
College American football venues in Mexico